Ishq FM, branded as Ishq 104.8 FM, (formerly Meow FM and OYE FM) is a romantic music FM Radio Channel in India that broadcasts in the major cities: Delhi, Mumbai, & Kolkata.
It was initially launched as Meow FM, which was a talk-based channel and served Delhi, Indore, Mumbai and Kolkata. It is an India Today Group venture and its format was directed at a female audience.  The channel got noticed for its catchy advertisement on BEST buses. It had also introduced "Meri Meow", a social network for its fans.
In September 2010 the channel had changed its name to OYE-FM and programming to a Filmi format. In December 2016 it rechristened to the current avatar of ISHQ 104.8 FM.

Channel Description
Ishq FM is India's first Romantic Radio Station airing over the FM frequency of 104.8 MHz. It airs era-agnostic Bollywood blockbusters from the romantic genre 24x7. The station's catchy jingle "DO THE ISHQ, Baby" has been composed by Sachin-Jigar.

The brand will have a target audience of 25-34-year.

See also
FM broadcasting in India
List of FM radio stations in India
India Today Group

References

External links

India Today Group
Radio stations in Delhi
Radio stations in Mumbai
Radio stations in Indore
Radio stations in Kolkata